Lewicki (feminine form: Lewicka) is a Polish-language surname. The surname may have several origins.  It can be a patronymic surname from a diminutive of the Polish given name Lew "Lion" or the nickname Lewek "Left-handed".  It can also be derived from either of the towns called Lewiczyn or, as a Jewish surname, from the meaning "of the Levites".

Other transliterations of the same surname include Levitzki, Levitsky and Lewycky/Lewycka

Notable people with the surname include:

 Aaron Lewicki (born 1987), American professional ice hockey player 
 Anatol Lewicki (1841–1899), Polish historian
 Anders Lewicki (born 1967), Swedish footballer
 Artie Lewicki (born 1992), American baseball player
 Danny Lewicki (1931–2018), Ukrainian-Canadian ice hockey player
 Jan Lewicki (1795-1871), Polish artist
 Karin Lewicki (born 1977), American writer
 Karolina Lewicka, Polish filmmaker and writer
 Marta Lewicka (born 1972), American professor of mathematics
 Olga Lewicka (born 1975), Polish born visual artist
 Oscar Lewicki (born 1992), Swedish footballer
 Pawel Lewicki (born 1953), cognitive psychologist
 Simon Lewicki, known as Groove Terminator, Australian electronic music artist
 Tobias Lewicki (born 1993), Swedish footballer

References

Polish-language surnames
Levite surnames
Jewish surnames
Yiddish-language surnames
Polish toponymic surnames